Bad! Bossa Nova is an album by saxophonist Gene Ammons recorded in 1962 and released on the Prestige label. It was also re-released as Jungle Soul! (Ca' Purange).

Reception
The AllMusic review by Scott Yanow stated" "This was Ammons' final recording before 'being made an example of' and getting a lengthy jail sentence for possession of heroin; his next record would be cut over seven years later... The music is offbeat if not all that memorable, a decent effort but not essential".

Track listing 
 "Pagan Love Song" (Nacio Herb Brown, Arthur Freed) – 4:45     
 "Ca' Purange (Jungle Soul)" (Natalicio Moreira Lima) – 9:35     
 "Anna" (Vatro – Giordano – Engvick) 3:20     
 "Cae, Cae" (Roberto Martins) – 3:46     
 "Moito Mato Grosso" (Gene Ammons) – 7:44     
 "Yellow Bird" (Alan Bergman, Marilyn Keith, Norman Luboff) – 5:07

Personnel 
Gene Ammons – tenor saxophone
Hank Jones – piano
Kenny Burrell, Bucky Pizzarelli – guitar
Norman Edge  – bass
Oliver Jackson – drums
Al Hayes – bongos

References 

Gene Ammons albums
1962 albums
Prestige Records albums